Pierre Ernest Ballue (27 February 1855 – 18 May 1928) was a French landscape painter and designer, associated with the Barbizon School.

Biography 
He was born in La Haye-Descartes. His family's presence there and in Buxeuil goes back to the sixteenth century. Two of his relatives served as mayors of the municipality: René (1804–1807) and Pierre (1816–1830). His parents relocated to Paris in 1867. There he studied art with Alexandre Defaux, and Camille Corot.

He became a regular exhibitor at the Salon and was awarded several medals. His favored place for painting was Touraine, but he travelled throughout France, to the Côte d'Azur, the area around Crozant, and in Fresselines. In 1886, he was one of the artists who accompanied Auguste Bartholdi to the United States, to celebrate the inauguration of the Statue of Liberty.

In 1895, he married Thérèse Pomey, a genre painter and miniaturist, who had been a student of her father, Louis Edmond Pomey (1831–1891). During World War II, she and André were members of the Resistance.

Ballue died in his hometown. A street there has been named in his honor.

References

Further reading 
 Yanick Antigny, Pierre-Ernest Ballue, ce peintre méconnu (1855-1928), Descartes, Antya Editions, 
 Paul Pfisterer, Claire Pfisterer, Signaturenlexikon - Dictionary of signatures, Berlin, Walter de Gruyter, 1999,

External links 

 More works by Ballue @ ArtNet

1855 births
1928 deaths
19th-century French painters
French landscape painters
People from Indre-et-Loire
20th-century French painters